Parornix crataegifoliella is a moth of the family Gracillariidae. It is known from Canada (Québec and Nova Scotia) the United States (including Maine, Pennsylvania, Vermont, Maryland and Illinois).

The larvae feed on Amelanchier species, Crataegus species (including Crataegus calpodendron, Crataegus parvifolia and Crataegus tomentosa) and Prunus serotina. They mine the leaves of their host plant. The mine has the form of a tentiform mine on the underside of the leaf.

References

Parornix
Moths of North America
Moths described in 1860